Yerres is a commune in the Essonne department, in the southeastern suburbs of Paris, France.

Population

Inhabitants are called Yerrois in French.

Geography
Yerres lies in the North-Eastern part of Essonne and bordering the Val-de-Marne
département. The town extends on both sides of the valley through which flows the river Yerres.

Sights

Caillebotte Estate

In 1860 the father of Gustave Caillebotte bought an estate on the banks of the river Yerres and the famous impressionist painted around 80 paintings there, until the sale of the estate in 1879. The most famous paintings the artist made in Yerres are Portraits à la campagne, Baigneurs, Bords de l'Yerres, Canotiers ramant sur l'Yerres. The estate and its magnificent garden are now owned by the town and open to visitors.

Saint-Honest Church
The first parish of Yerres could well date back to the 12th century. At that time a wooden church stood on the spot where the current church building stands. Throughout the years the church had different patron saints: Saint Lupus, Saint Vincent (a tribute to the many vineyards the town formerly counted), Saint Fiacre and now Saint Honestus. The church that can be seen in the town center was probably built in the 13th century but later modified.

Transport
Yerres is served by Yerres station on Paris RER line D.

Twin towns – sister cities

Yerres is twinned with:
 Mendig, Germany
 Sainte-Brigitte-de-Laval, Canada

See also
Communes of the Essonne department

References

External links
 
Official website 

Mayors of Essonne Association 

Communes of Essonne